Paatei Modi'in railway station (Tahanat HaRakevet Paatei Modi'in [Modi'in outskirts]) is the next-to-last station on the Nahariya-Modi'in Israel Railways line, serving the residents of Modi'in. It was opened in September 2007.  It served as the final stop on the line until April 2008, when service was inaugurated to the Modi'in Central station.

Between 2020 and 2022, the original southern side platform was converted to an island platform and a new southern side platform was constructed. The new platforms serve trains originating from or headed to Jerusalem–Navon railway station.

Station layout
Platform numbers increase in a North-to-South direction

References

External links 
 Israel Railways website
 Station information on Israel railways web site

Railway stations in Central District (Israel)
Railway stations opened in 2007
2007 establishments in Israel
Modi'in-Maccabim-Re'ut